Estonian grammar is the grammar of the Estonian language.

Grammatical processes

Consonant gradation

Estonian consonant gradation is a grammatical process that affects obstruent consonants at the end of the stressed syllable of a word. Gradation causes consonants in a word to alternate between two grades, termed "strong" and "weak", depending on the grammar. Some grammatical forms trigger the weak grade, while others retain the strong grade. It is not predictable which form will have which grade; this must simply be memorised. Not all words show gradation. In particular, words with stems of three or more syllables generally do not gradate, nor do words with stems of one syllable.

Gradation correlates with the appearance of extra length on a syllable. When a syllable is long, the strong grade will always be accompanied by extra length. The weak grade may or may not have extra length, depending on other factors. These are mentioned at Estonian phonology – Suprasegmental length. Some words show gradation only through the presence or absence of extra length, and the consonants themselves do not change. In this article, extra length is shown with a backtick ` before the vowel of the syllable.

The gradation patterns of geminate (long) consonants are relatively simple:
 Standing alone after a short vowel, the strong grade appears as a double voiceless consonant, while a single voiceless consonant appears in the weak grade.
 After a long vowel, or in a consonant cluster, the strong grade appears with a single voiceless consonant, while a voiced consonant appears in the weak grade.
 Long ss only gradates when it appears at the end of a cluster, with s appearing in the weak grade.

Patterns for single plosives are more varied and unpredictable. The weak grade may involve disappearance of the consonant altogether, with further consequences for vowels and extra length.

There are also four special assimilative patterns:

When a consonant is reduced to zero in the weak grade, this may cause the vowels of the two adjacent syllables to come together. These vowels undergo several changes:
 If the first vowel is long, it is shortened. Examples: r`oog: r`oa, n`eedma: n`ean.
 If either vowel is i, u or ü, it is lowered to e, o or ö respectively. Examples: nuga: n`oa, s`aagima: s`aen, süsi: s`öe.
 If the first vowel is a diphthong ending in e, the e becomes j. Examples: p`oeg: poja, `aeglema: ajelda.
 If the first vowel is a diphthong ending in u, the u becomes v. Examples: h`aug: havi.
 If the first vowel is a diphthong ending in any other sound, the second vowel is removed if it is identical. Examples: t`eadma: t`ean, l`iug: l`iu.

Assibilation

Assibilation is a change that happened in Proto-Finnic: the sequence ti became si. This change is no longer productive or predictable, but a fair number of nouns still display the effects in certain forms. The effect is visible in that sometimes s appears where there would otherwise be a t or d. This also creates new variants of the gradation patterns mentioned above, with s appearing in some of the forms in both the strong and weak grade.

For example:
 käsi, genitive singular käe, illative singular kätte, partitive plural käsi.
 uus, genitive singular uue, illative singular uude, partitive plural uusi.
 vars, genitive singular varre, illative singular varde, partitive plural varsi.
 kaas, genitive singular kaane, illative singular kaande, partitive plural kaasi. Also an example of another change that happened in some words, in which n disappeared before s. Consequently, there is no n in the forms that have assibilation.
 kolmas, genitive singular kolmanda. Here, too, n disappeared before s.
 kaks, genitive singular kahe, illative singular kahte. In this particular case, ht becomes ks where assibilation occurred.
 minema, first-person singular present lähen, first-person singular past läksin. Same as above.

Nouns

Inflectional endings as listed below are added to the stem of a noun, which is formed from:
 singular genitive: singular cases except nominative and partitive, plural nominative,
 singular partitive: plural genitive,
 plural genitive: plural cases except nominative and partitive.

Singular nominative, singular genitive and singular partitive are not predictable and have to be taken from the vocabulary (gradation may also apply).

Singular genitive always ends in vowel. When formed from a stem that ends in consonant, it can take the following endings: -a, -e, -i, -o, -u.

Singular partitive can take the following endings: -d, -t, -a, -e, -i, -u.

Plural partitive is formed from either singular genitive or singular partitive and can take the following endings (some words have two forms):
 -id: one-syllable words with long vowels aa, ee, õõ, uu, öö, ää, two-syllable words with long vowels or endings -em, -en, -el, -er, -ar, -ur, -e, -ne, -s or singular genitive with one or three syllables, three-syllable words with endings -ne, -s,
 -sid: one-syllable words with long vowels ii, üü or a diphthong, two-syllable words with short vowels, three-syllable words with endings -um, -on, -er, -ar, -är, -ov, -nna,
 -e: words with singular partitive endings -i, -u, -j, or singular partitive ending -a with the preceding syllable containing u,
 -i: words with singular partitive ending -e, or singular partitive ending on consonant with singular genitive ending -e, or singular partitive ending -a with the preceding syllable containing vowels e, o, ä, ö, ü or a diphthong with one of these vowels as the first sound with the exception of ei, äi,
 -u: words with singular partitive ending -a with the preceding syllable containing vowels a, i, õ or diphthongs ei, äi.

Singular illative has a short form in some words. It can take the following endings: -de, -he, -hu, -a, -e, -i, -u. In case it takes the vowel ending, this vowel is the same as the ending vowel of the singular genitive form of the given word, but the vowel (if it is already long or a diphthong) or its preceding consonant (if the vowel is short and the consonant either short or long) is lengthened to the third degree and thus becomes overlong. If illative ends with -sesse, then the short form is -sse.

Plural illative, inessive, elative, allative, adessive, ablative, translative have a short form in some words. If the plural partitive ends with -id, then the short plural stem is this form without -d (instead of plural genitive with -de-); if it ends with a vowel, then the short plural stem is this form; if it ends with -sid, then the short plural cannot be formed.

Emphasis: noun + -gi (after a final voiced consonant or vowel) / -ki (after a final voiceless consonant).

New nouns can be derived from existing nouns, adjectives and verbs using suffixes like -ja (agent, from -ma infinitive), -mine (gerund, from -ma infinitive), -la, -nna, -tar, -ur, -stik, -ndik, -nik, -ik, -k, -ng, -lane, -line, -kene, -ke, -e, -ndus, -dus, -us, -is, -kond, -nd, -istu, -u.

Pronouns

 reflexive (nominative – genitive – partitive, singular / plural): ise – enese/enda – ennast/end / ise – eneste/endi – endid (-self)
 demonstrative (nominative – genitive – partitive, singular / plural): see – selle – seda / need – nende – neid (this/that), too – tolle – toda / nood – nonde – noid (yonder)
 interrogative (nominative – genitive – partitive): kes – kelle – keda (who), mis – mille – mida (what), milline – millise – millist (which out of many), kumb – kumma – kumba (which out of two)
 existential (nominative – genitive – partitive): keegi – kellegi – kedagi (someone), miski – millegi – midagi (something), mõni – mõne – mõnda (some), ükski – ühegi – ühtegi (one)
 free choice (nominative – genitive – partitive): mingi – mingi – mingit (anyone/anything/any), kumbki – kummagi – kumbagi (either)
 universal (nominative – genitive – partitive): kõik – kõige – kõike (everyone/everything/each), mõlemad – mõlema – mõlemat (both)

Cases

There are traditionally considered to be 14 noun cases in Estonian:

Locative cases make up six or eight of these fourteen (depending on interpretation).

There are also some additional cases such as the instructive (jalgsi, "by foot"; käsitsi, "by hand"), or the similarly formed prolative (meritsi, "by the way of the sea"), which are not traditionally counted among the 14 grammatical cases.

Adjectives

Inflection and derivation 
Inflectional endings are added to the stem of an adjective, which is formed like the one for nouns. However, adjectives do not have terminative, essive, abessive, and comitative cases.

The stem for the comparative and superlative forms is the singular genitive of an adjective; if a word has two syllables in the genitive or a vowel following -ke(se), then -ke(se) is left out and the last vowel in the stem changes to -e. The genitive and the partitive of the comparative itself are formed with -a and -at.

New adjectives can be derived from existing words by means of suffixes like:
 -v (active present participle, from -ma infinitive),
 -nud (active perfect participle, from -da infinitive),
 -tav (passive present participle, from -tud participle),
 -tud (passive perfect participle), and -lik, -line, -lane, -ne, -ke, -kas, -jas, -tu.

Antonym can be formed by prepending eba or mitte to an adjective. Eba- is considered to be the only derivational prefix in Estonian; as mitte can also occur as a separate word, mitte + adjective can be regarded as a compound rather than derivative. Alternatively, for an adjective formed from a noun or a verb, an antonym can often be constructed using the suffix -tu or -matu.

Articles 

Estonian has no definite and indefinite articles. The function of the definite article can
be performed by the demonstrative pronoun see ‘this’ a) and of the indefinite article, first and
foremost by the indefinite pronoun üks b), developed from the numeral ‘one’.  (Pajusalu
2001)

Agreement 
Adjectival modifiers (including ordinals, demonstratives, and present participles) agree
with their heads in case and number. In the terminative, essive, abessive, and comitative
the modifier agrees only in number and remains in the genitive. See Case table above.

Most modifiers occur in the pre-noun position:
 a) demonstratives, e.g. see mees ‘this man’;
 b) adjectives, e.g. vana mees ‘old man’;
 c) quantifiers, e.g. kaks meest ‘two men’, kõik mehed ‘all men’;
 d) participles, e.g. jalutav mees ‘a walking man’,
 e) genitives, e.g. venna raamat ‘brother’s book’, eesti keel ‘Estonian language’;
 f) some oblique-case substantive modifiers, e.g. puust maja ‘wooden house’, nokaga müts ‘beaked cap’.

Post-noun substantive modifiers take the form of various kinds of adverbials, e.g. uks eluruumidesse ‘the door to dwelling rooms’,sõit linna ‘the drive to town’, vestlus sõpradega ‘conversation with friends’, mure laste pärast ‘worry about children’, tagatis eduks ‘key to success’, etc.

The non-agreement of the last four cases in Estonian is the manifestation of postpositionality of the affixes of the above cases. Postpositionality implies that there is no need to
repeat the case endings in coordinated phrases, e.g. naise(ga) ja mehega ‘with a man and a
woman’. The above affixes were treated as postpositions in earlier grammars, and some grammarians still follow this tradition. Only the comitative evolved directly from a postposition; the other cases followed suit.

Pro-adjectives
 numeral (nominative – genitive – partitive, with noun in singular nominative for 1 and in singular partitive for others): null – nulli – nulli (0), üks – ühe – üht (1), kaks – kahe – kaht (2), kolm – kolme – kolme (3), neli – nelja – nelja (4), viis – viie – viit (5), kuus – kuue – kuut (6), seitse – seitsme – seitset (7), kaheksa – kaheksa – kaheksat (8), üheksa – üheksa – uheksat (9), kümme – kümne – kümmet (10), -teist(kümmend) – -teist(kümne) – -teist(kümmet) (11–19), -kümmend – -kümne – -kümmet (20–90), sada – saja – sadat (100), -sada – -saja – -sadat (200–900), - tuhat – - tuhande – - tuhandet (1.000–999.000), - miljon – - miljoni – - miljonit (1.000.000–999.000.000), - miljard – - miljardi – - miljardit (1.000.000.000); ordinal: esimene – esimese – esimest (1.), teine – teise – teist (2.), kolmas – kolmanda – kolmandat (3.), cardinal_genitive-s – cardinal_genitive-nda – cardinal_genitive-ndat (others)
 demonstrative (nominative – genitive – partitive, singular / plural): niisugune – niisuguse – niisugust (this kind), see – selle – seda / need – nende – neid (this/that), too – tolle – toda / nood – nonde – noid (yonder)
 interrogative (nominative – genitive – partitive): missugune – missuguse – missugust (what kind), milline – millise – millist (which)
 existential (nominative – genitive – partitive): mingisugune – mingisuguse – mingisugust (some kind), mõni – mõne – mõnda (some)
 free choice (nominative – genitive – partitive): mingisugune – mingisuguse – mingisugust (any kind), ükskõik milline – ükskõik millise – ükskõik millist (any)
 universal (nominative – genitive – partitive): kõik – kõige – kõike (every kind), iga – iga – iga (every)

Adpositions

The following lists are not exhaustive.

Postpositions
 with the genitive case and declinable (illative/allative – inessive/adessive – elative/ablative): alla – all – alt (under), ette – ees – eest (in front of), juurde – juures – juurest (at), järele – järel – järelt (after), keskele – keskel – keskelt (in the middle), kohale – kohal – kohalt (above), kõrvale – kõrval – kõrvalt (beside), kätte – käes – käest (in the hand of), lähedale – lähedal – lähedalt (near), peale – peal – pealt (on), sisse – sees – seest (in), taha – taga – tagant (behind), vahele – vahel – vahelt (between), äärde – ääres – äärest (by)
 with the genitive case and non-declinable: eest / jaoks (for), järgi (according to), kaudu (via), kohta (about), pärast (on account of), vastas (vis-à-vis), vastu (against), üle (over), ümber (around)
 with the partitive case: mööda (along)
 with the elative case: alla (down), läbi (through), peale / saadik (since)

Prepositions
 with the genitive case: läbi (through), peale (besides), üle (over), ümber (around)
 with the partitive case: alla (down), enne (before), kesk / keset (amid), mööda (along), piki (alongside), pärast (after), vastu (against)
 with the terminative case: kuni (until)
 with the abessive case: ilma (without)
 with the comitative case: koos / ühes (with)

Verbs

The inflectional endings as listed below are added to the stem of a verb, which is formed from:
 indicative mood active voice singular first person of positive present tense (by dropping -n): indicative mood active voice of present tense, conditional mood active voice of present tense, imperative mood active voice singular second person of present tense,
 -ma infinitive (by dropping -ma; if the stem ends with a consonant, an additional -i- is added in the singular third person of the imperfect or an additional -e- is added in the singular nominative of the participle, the consonant is doubled if it was short and preceding a short vowel; if the stem ends with -e while being two-syllable or if it ends with a long vowel, then the -s- is left out in all numbers and persons, ei is changed to i, a long vowel becomes short and o, ö are changed to õ): indicative mood active voice of positive imperfect, quotative mode active voice of present tense,
 -da infinitive (by dropping -da / -ta / -a; long final l, r become short, in spoken language -nud is shortened to -nd): indicative mood active voice of negative imperfect, indicative mood active voice of pluperfect, imperative mood active voice of present tense except singular second person, active voice of perfect,
 participle of passive voice perfect (by dropping -tud): passive voice.

Present tense form and -tud participle are derived from the infinitives on the basis of gradation.

-ma infinitive indicates real action, i.e. action that does happen, has happened, or will happen.  It can be declined: -ma (illative), -mas (inessive), -mast (elative), -maks (translative), -mata (abessive).  The verb that precedes it also usually implies real action:  "harjunud lugema", "lähen lugema", "käib vaatamas", "olen valmis/nõus aitama", "saan hakkama".

-da infinitive indicates hypothetical action, i.e. the idea of the action rather than real action.  It can be declined: -des (inessive).  It is used in the following cases:

 In a compound verb when it refers only to the idea of the action: "tahan magada", "oskan lugeda", "saan hakkata", "võid küsida", "õhus oli tunda",

 In a subordinate clause that refers only to the idea of the action: "et paremini näha", "kui homme hommikul kell kuus ärgata", "kui mõelda asjalikult".

 As part of a participle where it refers only to the idea of the action:  "kasutada olev", "aimata laskev".

Verb derivation 

The following suffixes add meaning to a stem.

Conjugation paradigms

List of endings 

Emphasis: verb + -gi (after a final voiced consonant or vowel) / -ki (after a final voiceless consonant), verb + küll (positive), verb + mitte (negative).

Adverbs

Inflectional endings as listed below are added to the stem of an adverb, which is formed from:
 singular genitive of an adjective (-sti, -ti, -ldi, -li, -kesi): genetival type,
 singular ablative of an adjective (-lt; some are declinable in allative, adessive, ablative): ablatival type.

Some adverbs are special words – original or vestigial forms of an ancient instructive case.

Pro-adverbs
 demonstrative (illative/allative – inessive/adessive – elative/ablative): siia – siin – siit (here), sinna – seal – sealt (there), nüüd (now), siis (then), seega (thus), seepärast (therefore)
 interrogative (illative/allative – inessive/adessive – elative/ablative): kuhu – kus – kust (where), millal (when), kuidas (how), miks (why)
 existential (illative/allative – inessive/adessive – elative/ablative): kuhugi – kuskil – kuskilt (somewhere), kunagi (sometime), kuidagi (somehow)
 free choice (illative/allative – inessive/adessive – elative/ablative): ükskõik kuhu – ükskõik kus – ükskõik kust (anywhere), ükskõik millal (anytime), igatahes (anyhow)
 universal (illative/allative – inessive/adessive – elative/ablative): igale poole – igal pool – igalt poolt (everywhere), alati (always)

Syntax

The neutral word order in Estonian is subject–verb–object (SVO).

However, as one would expect from an agglutinative language, the word order is quite free and non-neutral word order can be used to stress some parts of the sentence or in poetic texts, as in Finnish grammar. For example, consider the sentence mees tappis karu which means (a/the) man killed (a/the) bear and uses the neutral SVO word order. The sentence can be rephrased using OVS word order as karu tappis mees—a normal Estonian sentence that could be more precisely translated as it was (a/the) man who killed the bear, i. e. the speaker emphasizes that the killer was a man, probably assuming the listener knows that a bear was killed. The other four word orders (tappis mees karu, tappis karu mees, mees karu tappis, karu mees tappis) are also possible in certain contexts, especially if more words are added to the three-word sentences. The following data (4–24, 50–72) are sourced from (Tauli, 1983) and (Erelt, 2009) at the University of Tartu.

Sometimes the forms of verbs, nouns and adjectives in the sentence are not enough to determine the subject and object, e. g. mehed tapsid karud (the men killed the bears) or isa tappis karu (father killed the bear)—in the first sentence because in plural, the nominative case is used in Estonian both for subject and telic object, and in the second sentence because in singular, the nominative, genitive and partitive forms of the word isa are the same, as well as those of the word karu (unlike the word mees which has different forms: sg. nom. mees, sg. gen. mehe, sg. part. meest). In such sentences, word order is the only thing that distinguishes the subject and the object: the listener presumes that the former noun (mehed, isa) is the subject and the latter (karud, karu) is the object. In such situations, the speaker cannot interchange the subject and the object for emphasis (unless it is obvious from the context which noun is the subject).

Basic clause patterns 

There are two basic patterns of clauses in Estonian: normal and inverted clauses (cf. also Erelt 2003, 2005a). In a normal clause the basic word order is SVX (subject – verb – nonsubject). The subject is unmarked, that is, it stands in the nominative, and the verb usually agrees with the subject in person and number.
An inverted clause has the word order XVS. The clause opens not with the subject but with an adverbial or oblique, experiential clauses with an object in exceptional cases. If there is a subject-NP in the clause, it is usually indefinite. If the subject-NP is a mass noun or a count noun in the plural, quantitative indefiniteness may be optionally marked by the partitive. (5,7) In the (non-contrastive) negative clause the use of the partitive is obligatory, (e.g. ex. 8). In clauses without a nominative subject the verb is always in the 3rd person singular. In the inverted clause olema ‘be’ is the most common verb. The main types of inverted clauses include existential, possessive, experiential clauses, clauses of state and source-marking resultative clauses. In existential clauses, as in (4)–(8), the clause-initial constituent is an adverbial of location (or time), and the clause performs a presentative function. In possessive clauses the possessor is expressed as a locative phrase. The latter is represented by the nominal in the adessive case (9).

The possessor is typically animate, as in (9), but it may be also inanimate, as in Autol on neli ratast ‘The car has four wheels’. Estonian makes no distinction in the expression of permanent and temporal possession. Occasionally, possessive constructions may be formed according to the model of normal clauses, that is, encoding the possessor as the subject and using a special verb, such as omama, evima ‘have’ (10). The frequency of the construction is on the increase. The pattern of the normal clause is also used to form the belong-possession, using the olema-verb and the genitive possessor together with the pronoun oma ‘one’s own’ (11) or the special kuuluma-verb ‘belong’ (12). 
Experiential clauses can be formed according to the pattern of possessive clauses, so that the experiencer is expressed by the clause-initial oblique in the adessive, and the ‘possessed’ state is expressed by the subject-NP, as in (13). This kind of state can be expressed also by the predicate adjective (14).

The inverted clause pattern is also used in the case of some experiential verbs. In the case of some of them (e.g. meeldima ‘like’) the experiencer has to be encoded as the allative oblique (15), in others (huvitama ‘take an interest in’, hämmastama ‘amaze’, etc.) as the direct object in the partitive case (16). Most experiential verbs take a nominative experiencer, that is, the normal clause pattern, as in (17). In clauses of “state” the clause-initial adverbial of location or time is optional. The predicate may be nominal, as in (18, 19), or verbal (20). The “source-marking resultative clause” (Erelt 2005b) is a marginal type of the resultative clause, where not the resultant state (goal) is marked, as in the normal resultative clause (22), but an entity that changes its state (21).

Case marking 

The Estonian language has no secondary or indirect object. A direct object can be in the partitive (partial object) (23), or in the genitive or nominative (total object) (24).
In the affirmative clause the total object refers to definite quantity and the clause expresses a perfective activity. If at least one of the conditions is not met, the partitive is used, for example, clause (23) denotes an imperfective activity; the clause Ta jõi vett ja hakkas siis sööma ‘He drank some water and then started to eat’ denotes a perfective activity but an indefinite quantity. In the negative clause only the partial object can be used, e.g. Isa ei viinud last kooli ‘The father didn’t take the child to school’. Some verbs, such as the verbs of cognition, only take the partial object also in the affirmative, e.g. Isa armastab lapsi ‘Father loves children’. The total object in Estonian does not express the perfective aspect as strongly as in the Finnish language, and for this reason perfective adverbs are often used along with it.
The total object is predominantly in the genitive. The nominative is used if the object is in the plural as in (24) or if there is (normally) no subject in the clause, and the object happens to be the most central argument in the clause, i.e. if the verb is in the imperative mood, e.g. Vii laps kooli! ‘Take the child to school!’, impersonal, e.g. Laps viiakse kooli ‘The child is taken to school’, or the da-infinitive (except cases where the da-infinitive acts also as the object), e.g. Isa ülesanne oli laps kooli viia ‘The father’s task was to take the child to school’
Measure adverbials behave similarly to the object in that they occur in the nominative/genitive or the partitive roughly under similar circumstances, e.g. Ta suusatas viis [nom] kilomeetrit / ühe [gen] kilomeetri ‘He skied five kilometres / one kilometre’ – Ta ei suusatanud ühte [part] kilomeetritki ‘He didn’t ski not a single kilometre’; Ootasin pool [nom] tundi / ühe [gen] tunni ‘I waited for half an hour / an hour’ – Ma ei oodanud ühte [part] minutitki ‘I didn’t wait even a minute’.

Word order in the clause 

The basic word order in the normal clause is SVX, and in the inverted clause it is XVS. The word order is flexible, that is, pragmatic order variants are allowed in addition to the basic order. However, one can observe the following trends in the location of the verb. In non-negated declarative main clauses the finite verb tends to retain the second position in all the thematic variants (50–51) (cf. Tael 1990, Ehala 2006). 
The verb can be located at the end of the clause in negative clauses if the clause does not begin with the subject (52), in questions (53), and in some subordinate clauses (54).
The positioning of the verb at the beginning of the clause and the resulting inversion can mark a speech act function (55)–(58) or can be used in narrative texts rendering past activities, e.g. (59) (cf. Lindström 2001b).

Interrogatives 

Polar questions are formed by means of the clause-initial interrogative particles kas (60) or ega (in negative clauses, as in [61]), verb fronting (62), or rising intonation (63). In spoken language questions can be formed also by the clause-final particle või, which developed from the disjunctive conjunction (64) (cf. Lindström 2001a). Questions begin with an interrogative word (interrogative pro-forms or kas (yes/no-question), eks (yes-question), ega (no-question)), followed by the SVO word order (in spoken language, interrogative words are sometimes left out, but instead there is either a change in intonation or VSO word order); answers: jah/jaa (yes), ei (no). An adjective precedes the noun it modifies. An adverb of time precedes an adverb of place.

Content questions are formed by means of interrogative pronouns and pro-adverbs, which are positioned at the beginning of the sentence (64, 65)(WH-fronting):

Negation 

Clausal negation in Estonian is expressed by means of the negative particle ei, which usually precedes the verb, e.g. (67). The particle ei is historically the 3sg form of the previous negative auxiliary. Standard clausal negation is asymmetric, that is, the structure of the negative construction differs from the affirmative not only by the presence of the negative particle but in various other ways, too, first and foremost by the non-finiteness of the main verb (Miestamo 2000). In Estonian the main verb does not carry inflections of the person and the number appearing in the connegative form in the present and in the past participle in the past (see example [67]). The other secondary modifications of standard negation include changes in case marking and word order. In a negative clause direct objects appear only in the partitive case. In the case of the inverted type of clause the same applies to the subject (cf. 2). The connegative form of the verb may be located at the end of the clause in negative clauses (cf. 6). In the imperative and the jussive prohibition is expressed by the partially inflected negative auxiliary ära (2sg), ärge (2pl), ärgem (1pl), ärgu (3sg/pl) together with the imperative form of the main verb (68). Unlike the negative particle ei, the auxiliary verb ära may be separated from the main verb by other words (69). In the case of constituent negation the scope of negation is marked by emphasis and optionally by the negative particle mitte (70, 71). The particle is placed immediately before the negated constituents, whereas the verb is optionally (but in the case of negated indefinites obligatorily) also in the negative form. The particle mitte is also used to express negation within an infinitive clause (72).

On DO Fronting:

Constituent negation:

Modifiers 

See Adjectival Agreement. Most modifiers occur in the pre-noun position: a) demonstratives, e.g. see mees ‘this man’; b) adjectives, e.g. vana mees ‘old man’; c) quantifiers, e.g. kaks meest ‘two men’, kõik mehed ‘all men’; d) participles, e.g. jalutav mees ‘a walking man’, e) genitives, e.g. venna raamat ‘brother’s book’, eesti keel ‘Estonian language’; f) some oblique-case substantive modifiers, e.g. puust maja ‘wooden house’, nokaga müts ‘beaked cap’. Post-noun substantive modifiers take the form of various kinds of adverbials, e.g. uks eluruumidesse ‘the door to dwelling rooms’,sõit linna ‘the drive to town’, vestlus sõpradega ‘conversation with friends’, mure laste pärast ‘worry about children’, tagatis eduks ‘key to success’, etc

Conjunctions 

 aga (but)
 et (that)
 ja (and)
 kas (whether)
 kui (if)
 nagu (as)
 sest (because)
 või (or)

References

 Moseley, C. (1994). Colloquial Estonian: A Complete Language Course. London: Routledge.
 Tuldava, J. (1994). Estonian Textbook: Grammar, Exercises, Conversation. Bloomington: Research Institute for Inner Asian Studies, Indiana University.

PART:partitive case
IN:inessive case ('in')
EL:elative case ('out of')
AD:adessive case
NEGV:negative verb

Estonian language
Languages of Estonia
Finnic languages
Finnic grammars